The Golden Globe (Portugal) for Best Film is awarded annually at the Golden Globes (Portugal) to the best Portuguese film of the previous year.

Winners
1996: Adão e Eva
1997: Five Days, Five Nights
1998: Temptation
1999: J Zone
2000: Jaime
2001: April Captains 
2002: I'm Going Home 
2003: The Forest 
2004: Quaresma
2005: In the Darkness of the Night 
2006: Alice 
2007: Coisa Ruim
2008: Call Girl
2009: Our Beloved Month of August 
2010: Doomed Love 
2011: Mysteries of Lisbon 
2012: Blood of My Blood
2013: Tabu
2014: It's Love
2017: Letters from War
2018: Saint George
2019: Rage

References

Awards established in 1996
Awards for best film
Golden Globes (Portugal)